The Ukrainian orthography is orthography for the Ukrainian language, a system of generally accepted rules that determine the ways of transmitting speech in writing.

Until the last quarter of the 14th century Old East Slavic orthography was widespread. The Cyrillic alphabet generally corresponded to the sound structure of the Old East Slavic language. For example, orthography consistently conveyed the softness and hardness of sounds — а, о, ы, оу, ъ were written after hard consonants, and ѧ, є, и, ю, ь were written after soft consonants. The letters ж, ч, ш, ц conveyed soft consonants.

From the 12th century the orthography changes: ъ and ь decline, there is a double spelling (чьто and что), and instead of these, the letters о, е (хочьть and хочеть) are used, labial and hissing begin to lose softness (new spelling въсѣмъ instead of вьсѣмь).

In the 15th and 16th centuries the orthography of written texts changed according to the rules developed in the Bulgarian city of Tarnovo by scribes under the guidance of Patriarch Euthymius (the second South Slavic orthographic influence): forms appear primarily in confessional-style texts твоа, всеа, accents are placed at the beginning and end of the word. The rules of the Tarnovo school are reflected in the spelling, which was normalized in the work "Slovenian Grammar" by Zizanii Lavrentii in 1596.

From the 17th century changes in the Ukrainian orthography come from Meletius Smotrytskyi's «Ґрамма́тіки Славе́нския пра́вилное Cv́нтаґма» in 1619, when the letter ґ, the digraphs дж and дз, as well as й were introduced; in the orthography of the magazine "Mermaid of the Dniester" in 1837 the letter є was first used in its modern meaning, and also first introduced digraphs йо, ьо; kulishivka in 1856, when first extended consonants began to be denoted by two letters (весіллє — now "весілля"), changes to Kulishivka P. Zhitetsky and K. Mikhalchuk in the "Notes of the South-Western Branch of the Russian Geographical Society" in 1874-1875, when the letter ї began to be used in its present meaning; zhelekhivka of 1886 with the final establishment of the use of the letters е, є, и and the apostrophe in their present meaning, to the spelling of B. Hrinchenko (hrinchenkivka) in the "Dictionary of the Ukrainian language" for 1907–1909, which is the basis of modern spelling.

From the beginning of the 18th century most Ukrainian orthographic systems use the "Civil Script" (simplified writing of Cyrillic letters), only M. Hatsuk in 1860 proposed to use "pre-Petrine" Cyrillic. There were also attempts to Latinize the Ukrainian language, which is still being debated.

As stated in the preface to the Ukrainian orthography of the third edition, it "is an organic continuation of the first (1946) and second (1960)." "The orthography commission at the Department of Literature, Language and Art Studies of the UkrSSR Academy of Sciences prepared and approved the third edition on November 14, 1989 (published in 1990)." On June 8, 1992, the Cabinet of Ministers of Ukraine accepted the proposal of the Academy of Sciences, the Ministry of Education and the Ministry of Culture of Ukraine to introduce the orthographic norms of the third edition into language practice starting in 1992. Subsequently, the Naukova Dumka Publishing House of the National Academy of Sciences of Ukraine republished the spelling. At the same time, “at first, stereotypical reprints of spelling continued to be numbered (1993 - 4th edition, corrected and supplemented, in 1994 an additional edition with the same initial data was printed, 1996 - 5th, stereotype., 1997 - 6th, stereotype. , 1998 - 7th, stereotype.), Then simply noted without numbering that the reprint is stereotypical (1999, 2000, 2002, 2003, 2004, 2005), and in the latter (2007, 2008, 2010, 2012) there is no bibliographic description at all". There is no bibliographic description in the new version of the Ukrainian orthography of 2019.

Periods of development 
There are from 3 to 5 main stages of formation of the spelling of the Ukrainian language:

 Ruthenian-Ukrainian period (early 10th—17th centuries)
 ancient Ruthenian-Ukrainian period: 10th Ruthenian-Ukrainian the third quarter of the 14th century.
 Old Ukrainian period: ost. quarter 14th — beg. 17th century
 Norms of "Grammar" by Meletius Smotrytskyi in 1619 (17th and 18th centuries)
 New Ukrainian period (19th century — present)
 search for the best spelling of the modern language: 19th century
 spelling standardization with the involvement of state factors: from the beginning of the 20th century

Ruthenian-Ukrainian period (early 10th—17th centuries) 
The origins of the Ukrainian orthography come from the Slavic orthography, initiated by the creators of the Slavic alphabet. Most Ukrainian graphics have hardly changed since then. In particular, in the current alphabet there are only two letters, which, according to prof. Ilarion Ohiienko, was not in the Cyril and Methodius alphabet — it is ґ, which is known since the end of the 16th century and became widespread in the 17th century and ї, which was first written instead of the former letter ѣ and in place of е in the newly closed syllable, and then took over the functions of the sound combination й+і. 

The orthography, which was based on the Slavic alphabet, was largely supported in Ukraine by natives of Bulgaria, who worked here and rewrote texts (mostly of church content). In the period from 14th to 16th centuries. the liturgical (and partly secular) manuscripts were dominated by the spelling developed by the Tarnovo (Bulgarian) Patriarch Euthymius. In Ukraine, the influence of this spelling has been felt since the end of the 14th century. and lasted until the 20's of the 17th century. This period is known in linguistics as the "Second South Slavic Influence".

Smotrytskyi's "Grammar" of 1619 (17th and 18th centuries) 
In 1619, Meletius Smotrytskyi's work «Грамматіка славенскія правилноє синтагма» was published, where Slavic-Ukrainian writing was partially adapted to Ukrainian phonetics. Then the meanings of the letters г and ґ were distinguished, the letter combination дж and дз was introduced to denote the corresponding Ukr. sounds, the use of the letter й is legal.

In 1708, the spelling of the letters changed, and the traditional Cyrillic alphabet was replaced by a simplified version, the so-called "Civil Script". Ukrainian scientists also took part in the development of the new alphabet and graphics. The first images of 32 letters of the new font, which still form the basis for Ukrainian, Belarusian and Russian spelling, were printed in the city of Zhovkva near Lviv. Outdated letters have been removed from the alphabet: omega, fita, ksi, psi, Izhitsa, yus the big, yus the small, instead the letters ю and я have been fixed, which were previously used only in separate texts.

New Ukrainian period (from the 19th century)

Orthography search of the 19th century 
In 1798, Ivan Kotlyarevskyi's Eneida was published, a work that pioneered new Ukrainian literature and prompted the search for modern ways of reproducing the Ukrainian language in writing. There was a need to change the traditional script. Writers who sought to write in the living Ukrainian language had to look for means to convey the true sound of the word, rather than being guided by ancient writing. In 1818 the letter і was added to the alphabet, in 1837 there was the letter є and combination йо, ьо, in 1873 letter ї was added. 

Instead, the letters ъ, ы and э could be found less and less often. The rapid and constant change of elements of the alphabet and their various uses gave rise to a significant number of experiments with the Ukrainian language and the creation of a large number (from 1798 to 1905 can be counted about 50 more or less common, sometimes even individual) spelling systems.

The most famous of these attempts:

 Orthography of Pavlovskyi
 Shashkevychivka (1837)
 Kulishivka — Panteleimon Kulish's orthography system in "Notes on Southern Rus" (1856) and in "Grammar" (1857)
 Drahomanivka (produced in the 70's of the 19th century in Kiev by a group of Ukrainian cultural figures under the leadership of linguist Pavlo Zhytetsky, which included Mykhailo Drahomanov)
 Zhelekhivka created by Ukrainian scientist Yevhen Zhelekhivskyi while working on his own "Little Russian-German Dictionary" (Lviv, 1886). This spelling is enshrined in the "Ruthenian Grammar" by Stepan Smal-Stotskyi and Theodor Gartner, published in 1893 in Lviv. Borys Hrinchenko used some corrections in the fundamental four-volume Dictionary of the Ukrainian Language (1907-1909). Most of the spelling rules (practically based on phonetics - "write as you hear") used in Grinchenko's dictionary are still valid.

Orthography standardization (20th and 21st centuries) 
Hrinchenko's work became an informal spelling and model for Ukrainian writers and publications from 1907 until the creation of the first official Ukrainian spelling in 1918.

On January 17, 1918, the Central Council of Ukraine issued the "Main Rules of Ukrainian Spelling," which, however, did not cover the entire scope of the language. On May 17, 1919, the Ukrainian Academy of Sciences approved the "Main Rules of Ukrainian Orthography", which became the basis for all subsequent revisions and amendments.

On July 23, 1925, the Council of People's Commissars of the UkrSSR decided to organize a State Commission for the Regulation of Ukrainian Orthography (State Orthography Commission). It included more than 20 scientists from the UkrSSR, who also expressed a desire to invite representatives of Western Ukraine: Stepan Smal-Stotskyi, Volodymyr Hnatiuk and Vasyl Simovych.

After almost a year of work in April 1926, the "Draft of Ukrainian Orthography" was published to acquaint the general public. After several months of discussion and consideration of the draft at the All-Ukrainian Orthography Conference (May 26 — June 6, 1927, Kharkiv), the orthography was adopted in accordance with the CPC resolution of September 6, 1928. It went down in history as "Orthography of Kharkiv" or "Orthography of Skrypnyk" from the place of creation or the name of the then People's Commissar for Education Mykola Skrypnyk.

In 1929, Hryhorii Holoskevych published the Orthographic Dictionary (about 40,000 words), agreed with the full spelling produced by the State Orthographic Commission and approved by the People's Commissar for Education (September 6, 1928).

In 1933, the orthography commission headed by the Deputy People's Commissar for Education of the UkrSSR Andrii Khvylia banned the Ukrainian orthography of 1928 as "nationalist", immediately stopped publishing any dictionaries and without any discussion in a very short time (5 months) created a new orthography that as never before he unified the Ukrainian and Russian languages. The letter ґ was removed from the alphabet, and Ukrainian scientific terminology was revised and agreed with Russian-Ukrainian dictionaries (the Institute of Ukrainian Scientific Language was abolished in 1930. The Ukrainian orthography of 1933 was approved by the resolution of the People's Commissar of Education of the UkrSSR on September 5, 1933.

Some minor changes were made to the orthography of 1946 and the orthography of 1959 (published the following year). It was connected with the document "Rules of Russian orthography and punctuation", which was published in 1956. From 1960 until 1990, the official edition was 1960.

After the beginning of the "perestroika" the issue of improving the Ukrainian spelling became relevant again - the editing of the spelling code was started by the Spelling Commission at the LMM of the USSR Academy of Sciences. The project was also discussed in the newly established Ukrainian Language Society. T. Shevchenko (headed by Dmytro Pavlychko). The new version was approved on November 14, 1989, and published in 1990. The main achievements were the restoration of the letter ґ and the vocative case (in Soviet times it was optional and was called the vocative form).

During the First International Congress of Ukrainians (August 27 - September 3, 1991) a resolution was adopted on the need to develop a single modern spelling for Ukrainians living in Ukraine and in the diaspora, which should be based on the entire historical experience of the Ukrainian language.

On June 15, 1994, the Government of Ukraine approved the composition of the Ukrainian National Commission on Orthography under the Cabinet of Ministers. The initial goal was to prepare a new version of the spelling in 2 and a half years (until the end of 1996), but the work on preparing the updated rules was significantly delayed. Finally, all developed proposals were submitted to the Institute of the Ukrainian Language in mid-January 1999. This project is known as the "Draft Ukrainian orthography of 1999" (because, among other things, it proposes to restore iotation before vowels, as it was before 1933).

Some modern Ukrainian publishing houses deviated somewhat from the rules of writing at the time, such as borrowed neologisms and foreign proper names. Thus, in many geographical, historical and artistic books, they use transliteration methods (from languages that use the Latin alphabet), regardless of the spelling: «А-Ба-Ба-Га-Ла-Ма-Га» (Kyiv) in a series books about Harry Potter; «Астролябія» (Lviv) in a series of works by Tolkien ("The Lord of the Rings", "The Goblin", "The Children of Húrin" and "The Silmarillion"); «Літопис» (Lviv); «Мапа» (Kyiv) and the encyclopedia УСЕ published by «Ірина» (Kyiv), as well as the publishing house «Критика». These editions refer to the German H and G in their proper names as Г and Ґ. According to the orthography of 1993, "G and h are usually transmitted by the letter г" (§ 87).

On May 22, 2019, the Cabinet of Ministers at its meeting approved the Ukrainian orthography in a new version developed by the Ukrainian National Orthography Commission.

On January 27, 2021, the Kyiv District Administrative Court annulled Cabinet Resolution No. 437 “Issues of Ukrainian Orthography”, which approved a new version of “Ukrainian Orthography” allegedly due to the fact that the Cabinet of Ministers of Ukraine did not have the appropriate competence. The Sixth Administrative Court of Appeal found the decision of the Kyiv District Administrative Court to cancel the new spelling illegal and annulled it.

Since the 2022 Russia-Ukraine conflict, it has become common to spell the proper noun Rosia (Росія; Russia) and any other nouns or adjectives related to it with a lowercase er, and likewise to spell the name of that country's President, Volodymyr Putin (Володимир Путін; Vladimir Putin) with lowercase ves and pes and using a transliteration of the Russian version of the first name, e.g. владімір путін. This practice is in place on popular Ukrainian news sites, in both Russian and Ukrainian, and also on government documents.

The structure of the current orthography 
Given in accordance with the wording of the orthography of 2019.

I. Orthography of parts of the word base (§ 1–65)

II. Orthography of endings of declension words (§ 66–120)

III. Orthography of words of foreign origin (§ 121–140)

IV. Orthography of proper names (§ 141–154)

V. Punctuation (§ 155–168)

See also 

 Ukrainian language
 Ukrainian alphabet
 Ukrainian Latin alphabet
 Chronology of Ukrainian language suppression
 Ukrainian orthography of 1904
 Ukrainian orthography of 1918-1921
 Ukrainian orthography of 1928
 Ukrainian orthography of 1933
 Ukrainian orthography of 1946
 Ukrainian orthography of 1960
 Draft Ukrainian orthography of 1999

Sources 

 Найголовніші правила українського правопису — передрук із київського видання 1921 р.
 Український правопис / НАН України, Інститут мовознавства імені О. О. Потебні; Інститут української мови — Київ: Наукова думка, 1994. — 240 с.
 Український правопис / НАН України, Інститут мовознавства імені О. О. Потебні; Інститут української мови — Київ: Наукова думка, 2007. — 288 с.
 Данильчук Д. В. Український правопис: Роздоріжжя і дороговкази. — Київ: Либідь, 2013. — 224 с. ISBN 978-966-06-0648-7
 Данильчук Д. Український правопис: Курс лекцій. — Київ: ВПЦ «Київський університет», 2013. — 60 с. ISBN 978-966-439-619-3
 Зубков М. Г. Українська мова: Універсальний довідник. — Харків: Видавничий дім «Школа», 2004. — 496 с. ISBN 966-8114-55-8
 Ющук І. П. Українська мова. — Київ: Либідь, 2005. — 640 с. ISBN 966-06-0387-8
 Українська мова у XX сторіччі: історія лінгвоциду: документи і матеріали / Упоряд.: Л. Масенко та ін. — Київ: Видавничий дім «Києво-Могилянська академія», 2005. — 399 с. ISBN 966-518-314-1 Зміст книжки. Djvu-файл книжки з текстовим шаром і навігацією.

References

External links 

 Друль О. Причинки до історії українського правопису // Збруч. — 2021. — 13 липня.
 Український правопис / НАН України, Ін-т мовознавства ім. О. О. Потебні, Ін-т укр. мови; ред.: Є. І. Мазніченко [та ін.]. — Київ: Наук. думка, 2007. — 285, [1] с.
 Український правопис / НАН України, Ін-т мовознавства імені О. О. Потебні, Ін-т укр. мови; [ред.: Є. І. Мазніченко та ін.]. — Київ: Наук. думка, 2015. — 286 c.
 Правопис Шевченка // Шевченківська енциклопедія: — Т.5:Пе—С : у 6 т. / Гол. ред. М. Г. Жулинський.. — Київ : Ін-т літератури ім. Т. Г. Шевченка, 2015. — С. 312-318.
 Український правопис 2019 на сайті Міністерства освіти
 Український правопис. — К.: Наук. думка, 2015. — 288 c.
 Український правопис. — К.: Наук. думка, 2012. — 288 c.
 Український правопис (1928)
 Німчук В. Переднє слово. У книжці: «Історія українського правопису: XVI—XX століття». (укр.). — Київ: Наукова думка, 2004.
 Історія українського правопису: XVI—XX століття. Хрестоматія. — Київ: Наукова думка, 2004. — 584 с. Djvu файл з текстовим шаром і навігацією.
 <i id="mwCFM">Синявський Олекса</i>. Норми української літературної мови. — Київ; Львів. — 1929—1940.
 Українська абетка — вимова звуків української абетки та презентація літер, які їм відповідають, транскрипція звуку за системою МФА та відповідне англійське слово, у якому вживається схожий звук. (укр.), (англ.)
 «Гражданка». Кирилична абетка для російської мови. (рос.)
 Проєкт українського правопису, 1999 р. В. Німчук. Інститут української мови НАН України.
 Українська мова, граматика, фонетика, лексика й фразеологія.
 Про «ф», «фіту» й «тету».
 Українські шрифти.
 Віктор Кабак. «Це — українська мова, та, яка має бути» — про використання норм «скрипниківського» правопису на телеканалі «СТБ». (укр.)
 IV. Правопис власних назв: Географічні назви слов'янських та інших країн
 Інструкції та кодекси усталеної практики з передачі географічних назв зарубіжних країн засобами української мови
 МОН пропонує для громадського обговорення проєкт нової редакції Українського правопису
 Коротенька українська правопись. — Біла на Підляшу: Друк. «Рід. Слова», 1917. — 15, 1 с., включ обкл.

Ukrainian orthography
Ukrainian language
Spelling